Bazine is a city in Ness County, Kansas, United States.  As of the 2020 census, the population of the city was 282.

History
Bazine was a station and shipping point on the Atchison, Topeka and Santa Fe Railway. The community was named for the French general François Achille Bazaine.

The first post office in Bazine was established in 1874.

Geography
Bazine is located at  (38.445977, -99.692549).

Climate
The climate in this area is characterized by hot, humid summers and generally mild to cool winters.  According to the Köppen Climate Classification system, Bazine has a humid subtropical climate, abbreviated "Cfa" on climate maps.

Demographics

2010 census
As of the census of 2010, there were 334 people, 135 households, and 92 families residing in the city. The racial makeup of the city was 83.8% White, 2.4% Native American, 12.3% from other races, and 1.5% from two or more races. Hispanic or Latino of any race were 25.7% of the population.

There were 135 households, of which 30.4% had children under the age of 18 living with them, 58.5% were married couples living together, 6.7% had a female householder with no husband present, 3.0% had a male householder with no wife present, and 31.9% were non-families. 27.4% of all households were made up of individuals, and 13.4% had someone living alone who was 65 years of age or older. The average household size was 2.47 and the average family size was 3.01.

The median age in the city was 37.8 years. 28.4% of residents were under the age of 18; 5.2% were between the ages of 18 and 24; 23.7% were from 25 to 44; 24.6% were from 45 to 64; and 18.3% were 65 years of age or older. The gender makeup of the city was 49.4% male and 50.6% female.

2000 census
As of the census of 2000, there were 311 people, 156 households, and 85 families residing in the city. The racial makeup of the city was 96.46% White, 0.32% Native American, 1.29% from other races, and 1.93% from two or more races. Hispanic or Latino of any race were 1.29% of the population.

There were 156 households, out of which 21.2% had children under the age of 18 living with them, 45.5% were married couples living together, 4.5% had a female householder with no husband present, and 45.5% were non-families. 41.7% of all households were made up of individuals, and 21.8% had someone living alone who was 65 years of age or older. The average household size was 1.99 and the average family size was 2.68.

In the city, the population was spread out, with 19.9% under the age of 18, 4.5% from 18 to 24, 25.4% from 25 to 44, 26.4% from 45 to 64, and 23.8% who were 65 years of age or older. The median age was 45 years. For every 100 females, there were 93.2 males. For every 100 females age 18 and over, there were 87.2 males.

The median income for a household in the city was $30,833, and the median income for a family was $37,500. Males had a median income of $26,250 versus $24,375 for females. The per capita income for the city was $17,749. About 2.2% of families and 4.4% of the population were below the poverty line, including 3.8% of those under age 18 and 13.7% of those age 65 or over.

Education
The community is served by Western Plains USD 106 public school district. The Western Plains High School mascot is Bobcats.

USD 106 formed in 2004 by the consolidation of Ransom USD 302 and Bazine USD 304. Since 2004 Bazine hosts the junior high school while Ransom hosts the high school, with each community having an elementary school. Bazine High School was closed through school unification. The Bazine High School mascot was Indians.

Bazine High School
The last year the school was open, there was a total enrollment of 41 students, 6 of whom graduated.  Students were dispersed to other schools in the county including Ness City and Ransom schools.

In 2004, Bazine High School was listed on eBay.  The 78-year-old building was purchased by a California businessman for $55,000.

References

Further reading

External links
 Bazine - Directory of Public Officials
 Photos of Bazine
 Bazine city map, KDOT

Cities in Ness County, Kansas
Cities in Kansas